Izaskun Osés Ayúcar (born 11 May 1985) is a blind Spanish Paralympic athlete who competes in middle-distance running events in international level events. She is a bronze medalist at the 2016 Summer Paralympics.

Oses Ayucar received a nursing degree in the Public University of Navarra and was an intensive care nurse in Navarra Hospital but her eye condition worsened and she had to give up her job. She has mainly focussed on training since then.

References

1985 births
Living people
Sportspeople from Pamplona
Paralympic athletes of Spain
Spanish female middle-distance runners
Athletes (track and field) at the 2016 Summer Paralympics
Medalists at the 2016 Summer Paralympics
Paralympic medalists in athletics (track and field)
Paralympic bronze medalists for Spain
Visually impaired middle-distance runners
21st-century Spanish women